Howdy! may reder to:

 Howdy! (Teenage Fanclub album)
 Howdy! (Pat Boone album)

See also
 Howdy (disambiguation)